Eighteen municipalities in Serbia held local elections on 4 November 2001. These were not part of the country's regular cycle of local elections but instead took place in certain jurisdictions where the local government had fallen.

Results

Vojvodina

Titel
Results of the election for the municipal assembly of Titel:

Milivoj Petrović of the Democratic Party had already become the leader of the local government prior to the 2001 vote and was confirmed as mayor following the election.

Central Serbia (excluding Belgrade)

Aleksinac
Results of the election for the Municipal Assembly of Aleksinac:

Radoslav Pavković served as mayor after the election.

Batočina
Results of the election for the Municipal Assembly of Batočina:

Miodrag Nikolić of the Democratic Party of Serbia was chosen as mayor after the election.

References

Local elections in Serbia
Local